is a 1973 Japanese film directed by Toshiya Fujita and starring Meiko Kaji. Based on the manga series of the same name by Kazuo Koike and Kazuo Kamimura, the film recounts the tale of Yuki (Kaji), a woman who seeks vengeance upon three of the people who raped her mother and killed her father and brother. The film's narrative is told out of chronological order, jumping between present and past events. Alongside Kaji, the film's cast includes Toshio Kurosawa, Masaaki Daimonm, Miyoko Akaza, and Kō Nishimura.

Lady Snowblood was released theatrically in Japan on 1 December 1973, and was distributed by Toho. It spawned a sequel, Love Song of Vengeance (1974). Lady Snowblood served as a major inspiration for the 2003 Quentin Tarantino film Kill Bill.

Plot
In 1874, a deathly-ill woman named Sayo gives birth to a baby girl in a women's prison. Naming the child Yuki from seeing the snow outside, Sayo confided to the inmates who helped deliver the baby how she was brutally raped by three of the four criminals who murdered her husband Tora and their son Shiro a year ago. While she managed to stab her captor Shokei Tokuichi to death when the chance presented itself, she was arrested and imprisoned for life. Sayo then seduced many prison guards in order to conceive Yuki.  Her final words were for the child to be raised to carry out the vengeance against the three remaining tormentors. In Meiji 15 (1882), the child Yuki undergoes brutal training in sword fighting under the priest Dōkai to become her mother's wrath incarnate.

Yuki, now twenty and an assassin going by the name Shurayuki-hime, blocks the path of several men and a rickshaw and kills them and their leader Shibayama using a sword concealed in the handle of an umbrella. Yuki appears in a poor village looking for a man called Matsuemon, the leader of an underground organization of street beggars, and asks him to find her mother's surviving tormentors in return for having killed Shibayama for him. Matsuemon's intel leads her to Takemura Banzō, an alcoholic wreck with gambling debts whose daughter Kobue works as a prostitute to support him. After convincing the gambling house's owners to pardon Banzō after he was caught cheating in a card game, Yuki leads him to the beach and remorselessly kills him after revealing her identity. Yuki then learns that the last of her mother's rapists, Tsukamoto Gishirō, had suspiciously died in a ship wreck three years prior when she first attempted to find him.

After attacking Gishirō's tombstone in frustration, Yuki finds herself being followed by a reporter named Ryūrei Ashio. She warns him to stay away from her. Ashio learned of Yuki's story from Dōkai who persuaded him to publish it as a means to draw out one of Sayo's tormentors: Kitahama Okono. Okono sends men to kidnap Ashio, threatening him with torture for Yuki's location, but Ashio refuses to tell. Yuki enters Okono's estate and kills several of Okono's men while pursuing Okono. Yuki and Ryūrei find Okono's dying body hanging within a room. Yuki, hearing Okono's dying heartbeat, slices her in half.

Ashio tells Yuki that Gishirō is his father, and had faked his death when he learned of Yuki's mission. She finds Gishirō at a masquerade ball and kills a man acting as his decoy. Ashio and Yuki find and follow the real Gishirō, who shoots Ashio. Wounded, Ashio grapples with Gishirō and stops him from shooting Yuki as she swings on a lamp between balconies. Yuki stabs through Ashio into Gishirō's chest. She then cuts Gishirō's throat as he shoots her. He falls over a railing and onto the ground floor full of guests.

Yuki, wounded, stumbles outside where she is stabbed by a waiting Kobue, who has been pursuing Yuki all this while in her own quest to avenge her father's murder. Yuki manages to escape, only to collapse on the snow, apparently dead. The following morning, however, she opens her eyes.

Cast

 Meiko Kaji as Yuki Kashima ("Lady Snowblood")
 Mayumi Maemura as young Yuki
 Kō Nishimura as Dōkai the priest
 Toshio Kurosawa as Ryūrei Ashio
 Masaaki Daimon as Gō Kashima
 Miyoko Akaza as Sayo Kashima
 Eiji Okada as Gishirō Tsukamoto
 Sanae Nakahara as Okono Kitahama 
 Noboru Nakaya as Banzō Takemura 
 Takeo Chii as Shokei Tokuichi
 Hitoshi Takagi as Matsuemon
 Akemi Negishi as Tajire no Okiku
 Yoshiko Nakada as Kobue Takemura
 Rinichi Yamamoto as Maruyama

Production
Kikumaru Okuda, a producer from the independent studio Tokyo Eiga, wanted to make a film starring actress and singer Meiko Kaji, known at the time for her role in Toei's successful Female Prisoner Scorpion series. He felt that a film adaptation of the Lady Snowblood manga would be ideal for such a project, and contracted Norio Osada to write the script and Toshiya Fujita to direct. Although the two men were friends, they were aware of their differing creative approaches; it was also Osada's first manga adaptation and Fujita's first action-heavy film. According to Osada, Fujita usually preferred a less tight script so he could shape his own films, but Osada presented his first draft to his colleague Kinji Fukasaku, who told Fujita that he would make the film if Fujita was not willing; the director immediately relented. Osada wrote the film with the intention that it would serve as a standalone adaptation of the manga rather than a launching point for a series.

The film's production was first announced in the February 1973 issue of Kinema Junpo; although Fujita was stated to be the director, the announcement revealed that  was the preferred choice for the title character of Kazuo Koike, the writer of the original manga. When Okuda approached Kaji for the role, she had become increasingly disinterested with the Female Prisoner Scorpion films, and was dissatisfied with playing roles in violent exploitation films, noting that the lead characters of both Female Prisoner Scorpion and Lady Snowblood were vengeful women. She accepted the role due to a desire to work again with Fujita, as they had developed a rapport when both were contracted to Nikkatsu, and after reading the manga. Kaji was also contracted to sing the film's theme song, "Shura no hana" (The Flower of Hell). Toei initially attempted to prevent Kaji from taking the role, although she would return to the studio to make the final Female Prisoner Scorpion film, 701's Grudge Song, after completing work on Lady Snowblood.

Lady Snowblood was produced on a relatively low budget, and filmed with a minimal length of film (20,000 feet). Yuki's sword was made from duralumin, weighed approximately 1.5 kg, and swinging it frequently hurt Kaji's arm. Kaji also recalled that at one point during production, a malfunctioning blood squib drenched her in fake blood.

Release and reception
Lady Snowblood was released in Japan on 1 December 1973, where it was distributed by Toho.

On review aggregator website Rotten Tomatoes, the film has an approval rating of 100% based on seven reviews, with an average rating of 8.05/10. TV Guide gave the film three-out-of-five stars, calling it "certainly entertaining, but unnecessarily distancing".

Sequel and influence
The moderate financial success of the first film spawned a sequel, Lady Snowblood: Love Song of Vengeance, released in 1974. Another adaptation of the original manga, titled The Princess Blade, was released in 2001.

A 1977 Hong Kong martial arts film, Broken Oath, directed by Jeong Chang-hwa and starring Angela Mao in the leading role is an unofficial remake of Lady Snowblood.

Lady Snowblood was a major inspiration for Quentin Tarantino's Kill Bill (2003–2004). According to Meiko Kaji, Tarantino made the cast and crew of Kill Bill watch DVDs of Lady Snowblood during filming breaks.

The 2017 music video for "rockstar" by Post Malone references scenes from Lady Snowblood.

Home media
Lady Snowblood was released on VHS in 1997, and was later released on DVD by AnimEigo in 2004. In 2012, the film was released in a box set with Lady Snowblood 2: Love Song of Vengeance on Blu-ray and DVD by Arrow Video. In January 2016, the film was again released with Love Song of Vengeance on Blu-ray and DVD by the Criterion Collection.

References

Bibliography

External links
 
 
 
 The Complete Lady Snowblood: Flowers of Carnage an essay by Howard Hampton at the Criterion Collection

1973 films
1970s Japanese-language films
1970s action thriller films
1970s crime thriller films
Japanese action thriller films
Japanese crime thriller films
Films directed by Toshiya Fujita
Films set in the 19th century
Films set in Japan
Live-action films based on manga
Rape and revenge films
Samurai films
1970s Japanese films